The standard of Prince Philip, Duke of Edinburgh, was the personal flag used by Prince Philip, Duke of Edinburgh. The standard shares the design of Philip's heraldic arms.

Design 

In November 1951, King George VI authorised Philip to use a personal standard consisting of his arms impaled with the arms of his wife, Princess Elizabeth. He did so until Elizabeth ascended to the throne as queen in 1952, after which his standard bore his arms alone.

Philip's standard after 1952 was divided into quarters, each alluding to a component of his ancestry or title. The top-left quarter featured three blue crowned lions on a yellow background with red hearts, derived from the coat of arms of Denmark, while the top-right quarter was blue with a white cross, representing the coat of arms of Greece and the country's flag at the time. Both of these represented his former status as a prince of Denmark and of Greece. The bottom-left quarter had five vertical black and white stripes, representing the House of Mountbatten, Philip's maternal family, and the bottom-right quarter bore a heraldic representation of Edinburgh Castle, taken from the city's coat of arms, to symbolise his title as Duke of Edinburgh. The whole design was blazoned by the College of Arms as follows: Quarterly: first or, semée of hearts gules, three lions passant in pale azure ducally crowned or; second azure, a cross argent; third argent, two pallets sable; fourth argent, upon a rock proper a castle triple towered sable masoned argent windows port turret-caps and vanes gules.

Usage 

The flag was flown above buildings and on cars to denote Philip's presence. It was flown except when the Queen was present as well; then the Royal Standard of the United Kingdom was used instead. As he was a member of the Order of the Garter, his standard was hung in the form of a banner in St George's Chapel, Windsor Castle, at all times until his death in 2021, when it was removed in accordance with the order's tradition. At Philip's funeral in St George's Chapel, his coffin was draped with his standard.

References 

Personal flags of the United Kingdom
Prince Philip, Duke of Edinburgh
1947 establishments in the United Kingdom
2021 disestablishments in the United Kingdom
Standards (flags)
British royalty
Flags displaying animals
Flags with crosses